Japonoconger sivicolus is an eel in the family Congridae (conger/garden eels).  It was described by Kiyomatsu Matsubara and Akira Ochiai in 1951, originally under the genus Arisoma. It is a marine, deep water-dwelling eel which is known from Japan, in the northwestern Pacific Ocean.  It dwells at a depth range of 300–535 metres.  Males can reach a maximum total length of 57 centimetres.

References

Congridae
Fish described in 1951
Taxa named by Kiyomatsu Matsubara